A A R Mahaveer Engineering College is located in Hyderabad, the capital of Telangana in south India.

History
The college was started in 2010 by the Mahaveer Education Society. The society has more than a decade’s experience in managing another college, the Mahaveer Institute of Science & Technology, which is co-educational. It decided to start a special college for women in 2010 and named it after Anjamma and Agi Reddy, the social service dedicated parents of chairman Sudarshan Reddy and secretary Surender Reddy of the Mahaveeer Education Society. The college was subsequently renamed as "A A R Mahaveer Engineering College" and also made coeducational.

Location
The A A R Mahaveer Engineering College is located centrally in the Greater Hyderabad Municipal Corporation, in close proximity to the Inner Ring Road. The nearest MMTS railway station is Falaknuma. The college runs its own buses from several points in the twin cities. The college is affiliated with the Jawaharlal Nehru Technological University, Hyderabad (JNTUH). The Telangana State Road Transport Corporation offers highly subsidized bus travel to students of the college, as part of their social responsibility program.

Academics
The college offers five undergraduate courses — Mechanical Engineering, Electronics and Communication Engineering, Electrical and Electronics Engineering, Computer Science and Engineering, Computer Science and Engineering(Artificial Intelligence and Machine Learning). The duration of each course is four years.

Student life

It is the policy of the college that its students not only learn the engineering subjects, but also acquire communication, lifelong learning, team, and multitasking skills. Slots have been incorporated in the time tables for library, sports and seminar activities. The college publishes AAR Mahaveer Newsletter, available at the college website www.aarm.ac.in to provide a platform to its students and staff members for their creative expression. It is also available on www. scribd.com. Several competitions are held and prizes awarded. These include technical quiz, essay writing, debating, music and dance, flower arrangement, Rangoli (traditional artistic designs on floor using colours), cookery, etc. Prizes are awarded to the first, second and third rank holders in each branch of engineering.

Administration

The college is administered by Dr. S. Murali, who has a B.Tech. in Mechanical Engineering from Naagarjuna University, M.E and Ph.D from Osmania University. He has 4 yrs of Industrial experience and 22 yrs of Academic experience. He has published many research papers related to international, national journals and conferences. His research areas are Heat Exchangers and Biofuels. He received Certificate of Commendation for meritorious service by Mahaboobnagar Municipality. He received Senior Educator and Scholar award by NFED. He has Professional membership in ISTE and IAENG.

Financial assistance

The government of Telangana State offers financial assistance to several students of the engineering college who belong to socially and economically weaker sections of the society, namely Scheduled Castes, Scheduled Tribes, Backward Castes A, B, C, D and E, and students from Minority communities, whose parental income is less than rupees 100,000 (US$1540) per annum.

These are in the form of tuition fee reimbursement schemes, scholarships, free or subsidized food and accommodation. The federal-owned Indian Railways offers concessional fares for students of the college between their residence and college and to their home town.

See also 
Education in India
Literacy in India
List of institutions of higher education in Telangana

References

External links 
 Official website of the Anjamma Agi Reddy Mahaveer Engineering College

Engineering colleges in Telangana
Universities and colleges in Telangana
Educational institutions established in 2010
2010 establishments in Andhra Pradesh